Eiji Mizoguchi (born 7 December 1964) is a Japanese professional golfer.

Mizoguchi played on the Japan Golf Tour and won twice.

Professional wins (8)

Japan Golf Tour wins (2)

Japan Golf Tour playoff record (1–1)

Other wins (3)
1994 Chubu Open
1999 Chubu Open
2011 Hokkaido Open

Japan PGA Senior Tour wins (3)
2019 Fubon Yeangder Senior Cup, Elite Grip Senior Open Golf
2020 Iwasaki Shiratsuyu Senior Golf Tournament

External links

Japanese male golfers
Japan Golf Tour golfers
Sportspeople from Aichi Prefecture
1964 births
Living people